Dan Schaffer (born 3 February 1969) is a British writer/artist working primarily in comics and film. He is best known as the writer and illustrator of cult comic book series, Dogwitch. He is also the co-creator/artist of Indigo Vertigo, a collaboration with Queenadreena / Daisy Chainsaw singer Katiejane Garside, and writer/artist of the original graphic novel The Scribbler.

Dan is signed exclusively to Nightsky (LA) and 1First Comics (Chicago).

Comics
Dogwitch: Direct to Video – writer/artist (Sirius Entertainment)
Dogwitch: Twisted – writer/artist (Sirius Entertainment)
Dogwitch: Mood Swings – writer/artist (Image Comics)
Indigo Vertigo – artist (Image Comics)
The Scribbler – writer/artist (Image Comics/1First Comics) 
Killdarlings – writer/artist (1First Comics)
White – writer/artist (1First Comics)
Malefic – writer (1First Comics)
Dogwitch: The Whole Shebang – writer/artist (1First Comics)
Peripheral – writer (1First Comics)

Films
Doghouse (2009) – screenwriter. Directed by Jake West, starring Stephen Graham.
The Scribbler (2014) – screenwriter. Directed by John Suits, starring Katie Cassidy, Garret Dillahunt, Eliza Dushku and Gina Gershon.
Peripheral (2019) – screenwriter. Directed by Paul Hyett, starring Hannah Arterton, Tom Conti.

References

External links 
Creator/artist website

British comics artists
British comics writers
1969 births
Living people